Peoples Temple is the third studio album of the Italy-based musician, Tying Tiffany. In 2011, the album was followed by the remix EP, Peoples Temple Remix Edition.

Peoples Temple track listing
 "3 Circle" - 3:36
 "Storycide" - 2:53
 "Lost Way" - 3:21
 "One Breath" - 3:18
 "Still In My Head" - 2:32
 "Miracle" - 3:18
 "Cecille" - 3:02
 "Borderline" - 4:21
 "Ghoul" - 3:16
 "Show Me What You Got" - 4:06

Peoples Temple Remix Edition track listing
 "3 Circle" (First Black Pope Remix) - 4:16 	
 "Storycide" (Spiral69 Remix) - 3:29 	
 "Miracle" (XP8 Remix) - 5:25 	
 "Show Me What You Got" (RevCo World Remix) - 4:35 	
 "Lost Way" (YLHCSD Remix) - 4:18 	
 "Ghoul" (Golkonda Remix) - 3:14 	
 "Miracle" (Iceone Feat Electro Disciples Remix) - 3:27 	
 "Borderline" (Alt Remix) - 3:53

References

Tying Tiffany albums
2010 albums